The so-called Jäger Report, also Jaeger Report (full title: Complete tabulation of executions carried out in the Einsatzkommando 3 zone up to December 1, 1941) was written on 1 December 1941 by Karl Jäger, commander of Einsatzkommando 3 (EK 3), a killing unit of Einsatzgruppe A which was attached to Army Group North during the Operation Barbarossa. It is the most detailed and precise surviving chronicle of the activities of one individual Einsatzkommando, and a key record documenting the Holocaust in Lithuania as well as in Latvia and Belarus.

Description

The Jäger Report is a tally sheet of actions by Einsatzkommando 3, including the Rollkommando Hamann killing squad. The report keeps an almost daily running total of the murders of 137,346 people, the vast majority Jews, from 2 July 1941 to 25 November 1941. The report documents date and place of the massacres, number of victims and their breakdown into categories (Jews, communists, criminals, etc.). In total, there were 112 executions in 71 different locations in Lithuania, Latvia, and Belarus. On 17 occasions, daily casualties exceeded 2,000 people. On 9 February 1942, in a handwritten note for Franz Walter Stahlecker, Jäger updated the totals to 138,272 people: 136,421 Jews (46,403 men, 55,556 women and 34,464 children), 1,064 communists, 653 mentally disabled, and 134 others. The report concluded that Lithuania was now free of Jews except for about 34,500 Jews concentrated in Vilnius, Kaunas and Šiauliai Ghettos. However, Jäger Report did not tally all Jewish deaths in Lithuania as it did not include executions by Einsatzkommando 2 in Šiauliai area (approx. 46,000 people), in some border areas (for example, in Šakiai on September 13, Kudirkos Naumiestis on September 19, Kretinga in July–August, Gargždai on June 24, 1941), or even in Vilnius (for example, the report is missing the October 1 (Yom Kippur) massacre of some 4,000 Jews).

Jäger concluded his report with the following:

The copy was discovered in 1944 when the Red Army reoccupied Lithuania, but it was not made known to scholars or the judiciary evaluating Nazi war crimes. Only in 1963, during the in absentia trial of Hans Globke in East Germany and four years after Jäger's suicide, Soviet Ministry of Foreign Affairs disclosed the document to the German Central Office of the State Justice Administrations for the Investigation of National Socialist Crimes.

Report tabulation

See also

 Einsatzgruppen reports, 1941–1942
 Wilhelm Cornides Report, 1942
 Katzmann Report, 1943
 Korherr Report, 1943
 Gerstein Report, 1945
 Riegner Telegram, 1942
 Höfle Telegram, 1943
 Special Prosecution Book-Poland, 1937–1939

References

External links 

English translation of the report along with scanned images of the original
Visualization of the massacres over time

Einsatzgruppen
Holocaust historical documents
The Holocaust in Latvia
The Holocaust in Lithuania
The Holocaust in Belarus
1941 documents